Pha Chor is a cliff located in Chiang Mai, Thailand, and is managed by Mae Wong National Park. Pha Chor is natural phenomena caused by an uplift of one of the Earth's plates and also by erosion of wind and rain. Geologists believed that a hundred or a thousand years ago this area was a part of the Ping River by observing pebbles and stones that were distributed in this area until the Ping River changed its flow direction to another path and that made this area lift to high hill. Through erosion the high hill formed into a cliff. Pha Chor is a  cliff that has a structure like a huge monolithic wall or Roman pillar. With unusual natural features that are similar to the Grand Canyon in The United States of America, it has caused Pha Chor to be known as the Grand Canyon of Thailand

References 

Geography of Chiang Mai province
Tourist attractions in Chiang Mai province